Shenzhen Investment Limited is a property developer in Southern China, partly owned by Shenzhen Government. It is also involved in the infrastructure and cement sectors through other companies. It was listed on the Hong Kong Stock Exchange in 1997.

External links
Shenzhen Investment Limited

References

Companies listed on the Hong Kong Stock Exchange
Government-owned companies of China
Companies based in Shenzhen
Conglomerate companies of China
Chinese companies established in 1991
Conglomerate companies of Hong Kong
Holding companies established in 1991